KSDT is an online college radio station which refers to itself as  "fiercely independent college radio". Its facilities are located on the campus of the University of California San Diego in La Jolla.

KSDT is completely student run and operated. Its community comprises staff members, DJs, interns, practice room members and general fans. The station regularly conducts interviews and studio sessions with San Diego and Southern California artists, as well as hosts off-the-air concerts, open mics and poetry readings. It publishes a quarterly zine featuring pictures from recent events, music opinion pieces and album reviews, as well as community art and poetry.

Organization

KSDT is a student-run radio station. Its staff, consisting of a general manager, promotions director, two audio engineers, programming director, marketing director, music director, webmaster, secretary, media director and design director are all required by KSDT's charter to be students at UCSD. Each staff member is required to maintain an internship program, the largest of which being those for audio engineering and graphic design. Oversight is provided by the Associated Students (AS) and UCSD administration.

The majority of the organization's staff and budget is devoted to providing a public service to the surrounding communities by playing music and hosting programming not normally heard elsewhere; usually taking the form of music shows featuring independent and underground music from a variety of genres. While indie rock music and its many subgenres are consistently found being broadcast from KSDT, other genres such as jazz, blues, electronic music, ambient music, experimental, hip hop, world, and others can also be heard on-air. This is not indicative of any preference of music directors, but more on the makeup of its volunteer student DJs and the communities they represent. Alongside the Che Cafe, KSDT was a large part of the San Diego Punk and Hardcore Scene during the 1970s and 1980s.

KSDT does feature an open-door policy to accepting volunteer student DJs. Any UC San Diego student can apply to be accepted into a quarter-long DJ training process, consisting of hands-on training as well as volunteer work. If training is completed, shows are then created in the next quarter for an hour-long time slot during the week.

KSDT also has a recording studio, which runs under the responsibility of the audio engineers. It has mainly been used to record songs and demos for local acts and student musicians, as well as to teach for the audio engineering internship program.

History
Founded in 1967, KSDT originally was a carrier current and FM cable radio station broadcasting on campus and to local cable TV subscribers. Throughout its history, KSDT has tried multiple times to obtain a terrestrial FM radio license, but failed due to strict Federal Communications Commission (FCC) broadcasting laws and its proximity to Mexico, whose stations occupy much of the usual US educational band. It continued to pursue this goal in the 1990s and early 2000s, although has recently preferred being an online station.

As a public service college radio station, the format was largely musical, with some community access programming. Commercial-free, it received funding from the University.

In 1999 it moved to become an internet radio station. In 2000 and 2001, it split with its "sister station" SRTV (student-run television).

Its current mission statement in part "strives to promote independent music not available from other sources and works to help the San Diego Community as well."

The recording studio on its premises was used to record and broadcast live many independent bands such as aMiniature, Rookie Card, Skeletor, The Locust, Estradasphere, Dressy Bessy, The Robot Ate Me, Creedle, Sub Society, Milestone, etc.

Artists such as Lemmy from Motörhead, Björk, The Flaming Lips, The Meat Puppets, Screaming Trees, Mogwai, Fugazi, and others have recorded station identifications for KSDT in the past.

References

External links
 Official Website
 Zine
 Associated Students of UCSD - KSDT

SDT
Freeform radio stations
Internet radio stations in the United States
SDT Radio
University and college mass media in the United States
University of California, San Diego
Defunct radio stations in the United States
Radio stations established in 1968
1968 establishments in California